Hero is the eighth album by Kirk Franklin, released October 4, 2005 on GospoCentric Records.

In 2007 Hero won the Grammy Award for Best Contemporary Soul Gospel Album and "Imagine Me" won the Grammy Award for Best Gospel Song.

Synopsis
Produced by Franklin and J. Moss, the album features songs with several urban contemporary gospel and R&B artists including Dorinda Clark-Cole, Tye Tribbett,  Marvin Winans (member of the Winans), Stevie Wonder, Yolanda Adams, and Moss himself.

Track listing

Personnel
<small>*Note: Personnel listing from Hero album liner.</small>

Vocalists
Ashley Guilbert 
Nikki Ross
Daphanie Wright
Anaysha Figueroa
Faith Anderson
Erica Davis
Jana Bell
Charmaine Swimpson
Isaac Carree
Eric Moore
Jason Champion
Anthony Evans
Myron Butler

Instrumentalists
Kirk Franklin - Keyboards, Minimoog, Piano, Drum Programming
Terry Baker - Drums
Shaun Martin - Keyboards, Drum Programming, Minimoog, Programming, Drums
Jerome Harmon - Keyboards, Hammond B3
Braylon Lacy - Bass Guitar
Doc Powell - Lead Guitar, Acoustic Guitar
Ernie G - DJ, Keyboards, Programming
Jason Bell - Lead Guitar
Sheila E. - Percussion, Percussion Color
Chris Godbey - Programming
Vidal Davis - Percussion, Additional Instruments
Andre Harris - Percussion, Additional Instruments
Ryan Toby - Percussion
Jason Boyd - Percussion
Humberto Ruiz - Trombone
Lee Thornburg - Trumpet
Paul Cerra - Saxophone
Dave Monsch - Baritone Sax
Jamie Hovorka - Trumpet

Orchestra
Assa Drori – Violin
Agnes Gottschewsky – Violin
Armen Garabedian – Violin
Elizabeth Wilson – Violin
Sally Berman – Violin
Brian Benning – Violin
Irma Neumann – Violin
Berj Garabedian – Violin
Robert Brosseau – Violin
Shari Zippert – Violin
Kazi Pitelka – Viola
Jorge Moraga – Viola
Renita Koven – Viola
Karie Prescott – Viola
Cecilia Tsan – Cello
Dan Smith – Cello
Miguel Martinez – Cello
Earl Madison – Cello
Frances Liu – Contrabass
Nicholas Phillippon – Contrabass
Katie Kirkpatrick – Harp
Gary Foster – Flute
Sheridan Stokes – Flute
Vince Trombetta, Jr. – Flute
Larry Caplan – Flute
Don Shelton – Clarinet
Jeff Driskill – Alto Clarinet
Phil Feather  – Bass Clarinet/Oboe
John Mitchell – Eb Contrabass Clarinet/Bassoon
David Duke – French horn
John Reynolds – French horn
Loren Marstellar – Baritone horn
Chuck Koontz – Tuba
Brent Fischer – cymbals/Timpani

 Notable Singles Hero featured the singles "Looking for You" and "Imagine Me". 
"Looking for You" was released as a single on September 20, 2005 in the U.S. and was a top-five hit on the Billboard's Hot R&B/Hip-Hop Songs chart.

 It also reached No. 4 on the Billboard'' Top R&B/Hip-Hop Albums chart.

Weekly charts

Year-end charts

Awards

In 2006, the album won a Dove Award for Urban Album of the Year at the 37th GMA Dove Awards. The song "Looking for You" also won a Dove Award for Urban Recorded Song of the Year.

References

External links
 

2005 albums
Kirk Franklin albums
Albums produced by Dre & Vidal